The Dictator's Guns is a 1965 French, Spanish and Italian international co-production crime film directed by Claude Sautet and shot in France and Spain. It was based on the 1960 novel Aground by Charles Williams.

Plot
In Santo Domingo, a Mr Hendrix asks the experienced skipper Cournot to look over the “Dragoon”, a ketch being sold by a widow in New York called Mrs Osborne. The Dominican police then arrest Cournot because Hendrix and the “Dragoon” have both disappeared, leaving several corpses on the shore. When Mrs Osborne flies in and corroborates his story, he is freed.

She wants to find her stolen vessel and Cournot suggests a seaplane pilot in Kingston, Jamaica, who flies the two in search of where the “Dragoon” was last reported. They find it aground, close to an exposed sandbank. On going aboard, Cournot and Mrs Osborne are taken captive by a vicious gun runner called Morrison who with his gang is already holding Hendrix and has overloaded the “Dragoon” with weapons and ammunition for delivery to Central America.

Morrison makes Cournot do the exhausting work of ferrying the heavy cases one by one to the sandbank, aiming to refloat the vessel and then reload it. Disputes among the crooks lead to Morrison being left alone on the sandbank with all the hardware while Cournot, Mrs Osborne and a wounded Hendrix are on the boat. Morrison keeps the “Dragoon” under constant rifle fire, hoping to hit the humans and disable the craft. He succeeds in holing the petrol tank, flooding the vessel with fuel which could go up at any moment. While Cournot is trying to pump it out by hand, Morrison swims aboard and in a final confrontation is killed. 
A rising tide floats the “Dragoon” so, hoisting the sails, Cournot sets course for Panama, a place where no questions will be asked.

Cast
Lino Ventura ...  Jacques Cournot
Sylva Koscina ...  Rae Osborne
Alberto de Mendoza ...  Hendrix
Leo Gordon ...  Morrison
Antonio Casas
Antonio Martín ...  Ruiz
Ángel del Pozo
José Jaspe
Ángel Menéndez
Jean-Claude Bercq...  Avery
Jack Léonard ...  Keefer

References

External links
 

1965 crime films
1965 films
Films directed by Claude Sautet
1960s French-language films
French crime films
Italian crime films
Seafaring films
Films set in the Caribbean
Films set in the Dominican Republic
Films based on American novels
Films shot in Almería
1960s French films
1960s Italian films